Terry Lee Luck (born December 14, 1952) is a former American football quarterback in the National Football League. He played for the Cleveland Browns. He played college football for the Nebraska Huskers.

References

1952 births
Living people
American football quarterbacks
Cleveland Browns players
Nebraska Cornhuskers football players